Louis Gentil Field is an abandoned airfield in Morocco, located approximately 6 km north-northeast of Youssoufia, about 170 km southwest of Casablanca.

History
Prior to World War II, Louis Gentil Airport was a regional airport built by the French Colonial government, named after Louis Gentil, a French geologist.  The airport was seized by invading Allied forces shortly after the Operation Torch landings in November 1942 and used by the United States Army Air Force as a Twelfth Air Force fighter airfield during the North African Campaign.

The 91st and 92d Fighter squadrons of the 81st Fighter Group briefly used the airfield from mid-December 1942 through early 1943 flying P-39 Airacobras.  The squadrons moved up to Mediouna Airfield, and the airfield was returned to civil control.

Today the remains of the main runway can be seen in an agricultural field, but no structures remain.

References

 Maurer, Maurer. Air Force Combat Units of World War II. Maxwell AFB, Alabama: Office of Air Force History, 1983. .
 

Airfields of the United States Army Air Forces in Morocco
World War II airfields in Morocco